Inodrillia acloneta is a species of sea snail, a marine gastropod mollusk in the family Horaiclavidae.

It was previously included within the family Drilliidae and then in Turridae.

Description
The length of the shell attains 12 mm.

(Original description) This species, recognizable by its large blunt tip and brownish livid streaks or tint, is notably variable. The variety which I have called acloneta is totally without ribs, and for this reason the fasciole is less apparent.

Distribution
This marine species occurs off the Florida Keys, USA, Martinique; the Mid-Atlantic Ridge

References

External links
 Rosenberg G., Moretzsohn F. & García E. F. (2009). Gastropoda (Mollusca) of the Gulf of Mexico, Pp. 579–699 in Felder, D.L. and D.K. Camp (eds.), Gulf of Mexico–Origins, Waters, and Biota. Biodiversity. Texas A&M Press, College Station, Texas
  Tucker, J.K. 2004 Catalog of recent and fossil turrids (Mollusca: Gastropoda). Zootaxa 682:1–1295.
 

acloneta